David Easter (born 11 November 1959) is an English actor. He is best known for his roles as Pete Callan in Family Affairs, Gil Keane in Emmerdale,  Mac Nightingale in Hollyoaks and Frank Fisher in The Bill.

Early life
Easter was born on 11 November 1959 in Eastleigh, Hampshire.

Career
Easter made his acting debut in the 1979 disco film The Music Machine. From 1984 to 1987 he played Pat Hancock on the soap opera Brookside. He has also acted in many theatre productions. In the 1991 London Palladium revival production of Joseph and the Amazing Technicolor Dreamcoat he played the role of Pharaoh & Levi, alongside Jason Donovan and Linzi Hateley.

He played Pete Callan in the television soap opera Family Affairs from 1997 to 2005. He has also appeared on Lily Savage's Blankety Blank and guest starred in episodes of Birds of a Feather, The Bill, Holby City and Doctors. In 2011, he appeared in the films How to Stop Being a Loser and Kill Keith.

On 21 November 2013, he made his first appearance as a recurring character in the ITV soap, Emmerdale. His character is a businessman named Gil Keane, who deals with Declan Macey's growing financial problems. He joined the cast of Channel 4 soap, Hollyoaks in May 2015, as Mac Nightingale, the mystery husband of bipolar sufferer, Cindy Cunningham (Stephanie Waring). They married during one of her bipolar episodes and he arrived asking for a divorce, on her wedding day to Dirk Savage (David Kennedy). In 2019 Easter left Hollyoaks when Mac fell victim to serial killer Breda McQueen.

Personal life
Easter was married to Denise Welch from 1985 to 1988.

Filmography

References

External links
 

1959 births
Living people
20th-century English male actors
21st-century English male actors
English male film actors
English male television actors
English male soap opera actors
Male actors from Hampshire
People from Eastleigh